XHJY-FM is a radio station on 101.5 FM in Autlán de Navarro, Jalisco. The station is known as La 100.

History
XEJY-AM 1540 received its concession on May 4, 1964. It was owned by Roberto Pérez González and operated from El Grullo, Jalisco, as a 500-watt daytimer.

In 1972, XEJY was sold to Radio Sistema del Suroeste and later moved to 1350 kHz. XEJY would move to 1260 in the 1990s, when it moved its transmitter to Autlán.

XEJY was authorized for AM-FM migration in 2011. It was transferred to the current concessionaire in 2015. In 2018, the station left the MVS Radio La Mejor format and relaunched as La 100.

References

Radio stations in Jalisco